Kusza (pronounced Ku-Sha) is a Polish coat of arms.

Families using the main variant of the coat are: Bystrycki, Bystrzycki, Korejwa or Koreywa, Leszczynowicz, Kosicki, Kuszcz, Kuszczyński, Maszkiewicz, Maślakiewicz, Oławski, and Otawski.

Families using Kusza II are Bajrasz, and Czyczuda.

History

Blazon

Variations
There are four variations of this coat of arms:

 KUSZA I "On a red field, a silver crossbow, without the arrow, and pointing downwards"
 KUSZA II "On a red field, a silver crossbow, without the arrow, pointing upwards"
 KUSZA III "On a red field, a silver crossbow, with a cyphered arrow, pointing upwards, and beneath the charge three silver chevrons (battons)"
 KUSZA IV "On a red field, a silver crossbow (with an arrow), pointing downwards, sometimes upwards".

Notable bearers
Notable bearers of this coat of arms include:

See also
 Polish heraldry
 List of coats of arms of Polish nobility

Related coats
 Kuszaba coat of arms

References

Polish coats of arms